{{Infobox
| bodystyle  = width:20em;
| abovestyle = background:inherit; font-weight:bold;
| labelstyle = background:inherit; white-space:nowrap;
| above      = <small>Harry Potter books</small>The Tales of Beedle the Bard
| image      = 
| caption    = The cover of the UK public paperback edition.
| label1     = Author
| data1      = J. K. Rowling
| label2     = Illustrator
| data2      = J. K. Rowling
| label3     = Genre
| data3      = Fantasy
| label4     = Auction date
| data4      = 13 December 2007 (handmade edition)
| label5     = Winning bid
| data5      = £1.95 / US$3.98 / €2.28 million (Amazon.com)
| label6     = Publisher
| data6      = Children's High Level Group in association with Bloomsbury Publishing Plc
| label7     = Publication date
| data7      = 4 December 2008 (public edition)
| label8     = Pages
| data8      = Handmade edition: 157 Paperback edition: 110 Collector's edition: 180
}}The Tales of Beedle the Bard is a book of children's stories by the author J. K. Rowling. There is a storybook of the same name mentioned in Harry Potter and the Deathly Hallows, the last book of the Harry Potter series.

The book was originally produced in a limited edition of only seven copies, each handwritten and illustrated by J. K. Rowling. One of them was offered for auction through Sotheby's in late 2007 and was expected to sell for £50,000 (US$77,000, €69,000); ultimately it was bought for £1.95 million ($3 million, €2.7 million) by Amazon, making the selling price the highest achieved at auction for a modern literary manuscript. The money earned at the auction of the book was donated to The Children's Voice charity campaign.

The book was published for the general public on 4 December 2008, with the proceeds going to the Children's High Level Group (renamed Lumos in 2010).

In the Harry Potter series

The Tales of Beedle the Bard first appeared as a fictional book in J. K. Rowling's 2007 Harry Potter and the Deathly Hallows, the seventh and final novel of the Harry Potter series. The book is bequeathed to Hermione Granger by Albus Dumbledore, former headmaster of Hogwarts School of Witchcraft and Wizardry. It is described as a popular collection of Wizarding children's fairy tales, so that while Ron Weasley is familiar with the stories, Harry Potter and Hermione Granger had not previously heard of them due to their non-magical upbringing.

The book Hermione receives in Dumbledore's will is a copy of the original edition of the fictional book. It is described as an ancient-looking small book with its binding "stained and peeling in places". In the novel it is also said the book has a title on its cover, written in embossed runic symbols.

The book acts as the vehicle for introducing the Deathly Hallows to the trio. Above the story "The Tale of the Three Brothers", Hermione Granger finds a strange symbol which later is revealed by Xenophilius Lovegood to be the symbol of the Hallows. The triangle from the symbol represents the Invisibility Cloak, the circle inside the triangle symbolises the Resurrection Stone, and the vertical line represents the Elder Wand.

These three objects are also mentioned in the story itself, and are said to belong to the Peverell brothers, who are later revealed as being both Voldemort's and Harry Potter's ancestors. Towards the end of the novel, Albus Dumbledore also confirms Harry's connection to the Peverells, and states that the three brothers might in fact have been the creators of the Hallows.

The introduction (written by Rowling) to the publications released in December 2008 mentions that the fictional character Beedle the Bard was born in Yorkshire, lived in the 15th century, and had "an exceptionally luxuriant beard".

Publication history
Rowling started writing the book soon after finishing work on the seventh Harry Potter novel. During an interview with her fandom she also stated that she used other books as a source of inspiration for the tales. More specifically, "The Tale of the Three Brothers", the only story included entirely in The Deathly Hallows, was inspired by Geoffrey Chaucer's "The Pardoner's Tale" from The Canterbury Tales.

Handmade edition
Originally The Tales of Beedle the Bard had only been produced in a limited number of seven handmade copies, all handwritten and illustrated by the author herself. The books were bound in brown morocco leather, and decorated with hand-chased silver ornaments and mounted semiprecious stones by silversmith and jeweller Hamilton & Inches of Edinburgh. Each of the silver pieces represents one of the five stories in the book. Rowling also asked that each of the seven copies be embellished using a different semiprecious stone.

Six of these original handwritten copies were uniquely dedicated and given by Rowling to six people who were most involved with the Harry Potter series. The recipients of these copies were not initially identified. Since then, two of these people have been named. One is Barry Cunningham, Rowling's very first editor. Another is Arthur A. Levine, editor for Scholastic, the U.S. publisher of the Harry Potter books. Cunningham and Levine had lent their personal copies as part of Beedle the Bard exhibits in December 2008.

Rowling also decided to create a seventh handwritten copy (distinguished from the others by its moonstone jewelling) to sell at auction in order to raise funds for The Children's Voice charity campaign.

Auction

The 157-page "Moonstone edition" of the book was first put on display prior to bidding on 26 November in New York and on 9 December in London. The book was auctioned 13 December 2007, at Sotheby's in London. The starting price was £30,000 ($62,000, €46,000), and originally it was expected to sell for approximately £50,000 ($103,000, €80,000). The closing bid far exceeded all prior projections, as ultimately the book was purchased by a representative from London fine art dealers Hazlitt Gooden and Fox on behalf of Amazon, for a total of £1.95 million ($3.98 million, €2.28 million). This was the highest purchase price for a modern literary manuscript at that date. The money earned at auction later was donated by Rowling to The Children's Voice charity campaign.

Sotheby's printed a forty-eight-page promotional catalogue for the auction. The catalogue featured illustrations from the book, as well as comments from J. K. Rowling on The Tales of Beedle the Bard. The catalogue was sold as a collector's item, and the money from that sale also has been donated to The Children's Voice.

Cunningham's copy of the book was put up for auction in November 2016. It was auctioned for £368,750 on 12 December 2016. The book was auctioned by Sotheby's in London. The book is a leather bound manuscript decorated with rhodochrosite gemstones, and a silver skull. This copy features an author's note addressed to Cunningham which reads “To Barry, the man who thought an overlong novel about a boy wizard in glasses might just sell … THANK YOU.” She has also added a note describing the gemstones as being “traditionally associated with love, balance and joy in daily life”.

Public editions

On 31 July 2008, it was announced The Tales of Beedle the Bard would also be made available for the public, in both standard and collector's editions. The book was published by Children's High Level Group and printed and distributed by Bloomsbury, Scholastic, and Amazon.com. The decision was taken due to disappointment among Harry Potter fans after it had initially been announced a wide public release was not intended.

Similarly to Fantastic Beasts and Where to Find Them and Quidditch Through the Ages (two other books mentioned in the Harry Potter novels that have also been printed) the standard and collector's editions of The Tales of Beedle the Bard feature commentary and footnotes from Albus Dumbledore, headmaster of Hogwarts and one of the main characters of the series. The standard edition also includes illustrations reproduced from the handwritten edition auctioned in December 2007 and the introduction by the author. The limited collector's edition features ten illustrations by J.K. Rowling not included in the standard edition or the original handcrafted edition, as well as an exclusive reproduction of J.K. Rowling's handwritten introduction, and other miscellaneous objects such as replica gemstones and an emerald ribbon.

The book, released on 4 December 2008, was published in the United Kingdom and Canada by Bloomsbury, while the US edition was published by Scholastic, and the limited collector's edition of the book, available in all three countries, by Amazon. The limited edition retailed for £50 ($100, €100), and around 100,000 copies have been printed. The book has been translated into 28 languages. Profits from the sale of the book were offered to the Children's High Level Group. Initial sale estimates were roughly £4 million ($7.6 million, €4.7 million); as of January 2010 an estimated £11 million ($17 million, €13 million) were generated from sales for the charity.

Synopsis

Overview
Rowling wrote five stories for the book. One, "The Warlock's Hairy Heart", is not mentioned in Harry Potter and the Deathly Hallows; three others, "The Wizard and the Hopping Pot", "The Fountain of Fair Fortune", and "Babbitty Rabbitty and her Cackling Stump", receive cursory attention. "The Tale of the Three Brothers" is the only story which is included entirely in The Deathly Hallows.

"The Wizard and the Hopping Pot"
This story is about the legacy of an old man who, in his generosity, used his magic for other people when they needed his help; he credited his potions pot as the source of his antidotes. Upon his death, he leaves all his belongings to his only son, who has none of the virtues his father had. After his father's death, the son finds the pot and a single slipper inside it together with a note from his father that reads, "In the fond hope, my son, that you will never need it".

Bitter for having nothing left but a pot, the son closes the door on every person who asks for his help. He does not help over five people, so each time he does so, the pot takes on the symptoms of the ones who ask for help; it starts disturbing the son and prevents him from having any peace of mind. This continues until the son finally gives up and provides aid to the town. Upon doing this, the pot's ailments are removed one by one and the son's ordeal finally ends when the slipper he received from his father falls out of the pot; he puts the slipper on the pot's foot and the two walk off into the sunset.

"The Fountain of Fair Fortune"
In this story, there is a fountain where once per year, one person may bathe and have their problems answered. Three witches—Asha, who suffers from an incurable disease; Altheda, who was robbed of her wand and wealth; and Amata, who is distraught after being left by her beloved—decide to try to reach the fountain together but along the way, a luckless Muggle knight, Sir Luckless, also joins them.

On their path to the fountain, they face three challenges: a giant worm that demands "proof of [their] pain", which quenches its thirst with the tears Asha sheds from frustration after several failed attempts; a steep slope where they have to bring the "fruit of their labours", which Altheda encourages the others to overcome with her with her hard-earned effort and the sweat of her brow; and a river that requires them to pay for crossing it with "the treasure of [their] past", which Amata uses as a Pensieve that washes away her regret for her cruel and false lover, thus removing her need of the fountain. After the four cross the river, however, Asha collapses from exhaustion; to save her, Altheda brews an invigorating potion that also cures Asha of her disease and need of the fountain, in turn causing Altheda to realise that her skills are a means to earn money without the fountain.

Sir Luckless bathes in the fountain, after which he flings himself at Amata's feet and asks for "her hand and her heart", which she happily gives. Everyone gets an answer to his or her problem, unaware that the fountain holds no magical power at all.

"The Warlock's Hairy Heart"
The story is about a young and handsome warlock who decides to never fall in love, so he uses Dark Arts to prevent himself from doing so. His family, hoping he will change, does nothing. However, one day, he hears two servants whispering about him not having a wife, so he decides to find a talented, rich, and beautiful witch and marry her to gain everyone's envy.

By coincidence, he meets that girl the next day. Though the girl is both "fascinated and repelled", the warlock persuades her to come to a dinner feast at his castle. During the feast, she tells him that she needs to know he has a heart. The warlock shows her his beating heart, now covered in hair, inside a crystal casket in his dungeon. The witch begs him to put it back inside himself, after which she embraces him. However, being disconnected from its body for so long, his heart has developed savage tastes as it has degenerated into an animalistic state. And so he is driven to take by force a truly human heart, tearing out the witch's to replace his own; but upon finding that he cannot magic the hairy heart back out of his chest, he cuts it out with a dagger. Thus he and the maiden both die, with him holding both hearts in his hands.

"Babbitty Rabbitty and her Cackling Stump"
This story is about a king who wants to keep all magic to himself. To do this he needs to solve two problems: he must capture and imprison all of the sorcerers in the kingdom and he has to learn magic. He creates a "Brigade of Witch Hunters" and calls for an instructor in magic. Only a "cunning charlatan" with no magical ability responds. The charlatan proves himself with a few simple tricks and begins to ask for jewellery and money to continue teaching. However, Babbitty, the king's washerwoman, laughs at the king one day as he attempts to do magic with an ordinary twig. This causes the king to demand the charlatan join him in a public demonstration of magic and warns that the charlatan will be beheaded if anyone laughs. The charlatan later witnesses Babbitty performing magic in her house. He threatens to expose her if she does not assist him. She agrees to hide and help the demonstration.

During the performance, the brigade captain asks the king to bring his dead hound back to life. Because Babbitty cannot use magic to raise the dead, the crowd thinks the previous acts were tricks. The charlatan exposes Babbitty, accusing her of blocking the spells. Babbitty flees into a forest and disappears at the base of an old tree. In desperation, the charlatan states that she has turned "into a crab apple" and has the tree cut down.

As the crowd departs, the stump starts cackling and makes the charlatan confess. The stump cackles again, demanding the king never hurt a wizard again, and build a statue of Babbitty on the stump to remind him of his foolishness. The king agrees and heads back to the palace. Afterwards, a "stout old rabbit" with a wand in its teeth hops out from a hole beneath the stump and leaves the kingdom.

"The Tale of the Three Brothers"
The story is about three brothers who, while traveling together, reach a treacherous river. They make a magical bridge over the river wherein just as they cross, they meet the personification of Death, who is angry for losing three potential victims. He pretends to be impressed by them and grants each a gift as a reward, hoping to use each gift to bring about their eventual demises. The oldest brother asks for an unbeatable dueling wand, so Death gives him the Elder Wand. The middle brother asks for the ability to resurrect the dead to humiliate Death further, so Death gives him the Resurrection Stone. The youngest brother, a humbler man, does not trust Death and asks for a way to stop Death from following him, so Death reluctantly gives him his Cloak of Invisibility. Afterward, the brothers go their separate ways.

The oldest brother resolves a previous qualm by using the wand to kill the man with whom he quarreled, but his bragging about the wand's incredible power results in him getting robbed of it and murdered in his sleep, allowing Death to claim him. The middle brother resolves a previous loss by using the stone to bring back the woman to whom he wanted to be married, but she is revealed to be non-corporeal and full of sorrow for being back in the mortal world; in grief, he commits suicide, allowing Death to claim him. However, Death never manages to find the youngest brother, as he stays hidden under the invisibility cloak. Many years later, the brother removes his cloak and gives it to his son. Content with the life he has lived, he greets Death as an old friend and equal, thereby dying of natural causes.

Reception
The Tales of Beedle the Bard received generally positive critical reception. Sotheby's deputy director Philip W. Errington described the handmade edition as "one of the most exciting pieces of children's literature" to have passed through the auction house. After buying the book, Amazon also released a review, describing it as "an artifact pulled straight out of a novel".

The Times reviewed the published book favourably, calling the tales "funny, sinister, wise and captivating" and likening them to the tales collected by the Brothers Grimm. The Telegraph reviewed it unfavourably, noting that they "would be unremarkable were it not for the body of work that lies behind it" and that there was "an element of padding to make it a respectable length".

Live show
A live puppet show of The Fountain of Fair Fortune and The Tale of the Three Brothers is presented daily at the Diagon Alley expansion of The Wizarding World of Harry Potter at Universal Studios Florida.

Film adaptation 
Due to "The Tale of the Three Brothers" originally being in the novel Harry Potter and the Deathly Hallows, the story was also adapted as an animated short in the novel's first film adaptation, Harry Potter and the Deathly Hallows – Part 1. The sequence was directed by Ben Hibon and animated at Framestore; like in the novel, it is also narrated in-universe by Hermione Granger (Emma Watson).

See also
 List of most expensive books and manuscripts

References

Books by J. K. Rowling
Collections of fairy tales
Fictional books
2008 short story collections
Fiction about personifications of death
Wizarding World books